Johannes Rydzek (born 9 December 1991) is a German nordic combined skier who has competed since 2006.

Career
He won a bronze medal in the 4 x 5 km team event at the 2010 Winter Olympics in Vancouver.

He won five World Cup races. His first win came in March 2011, in Lahti, Finland. Also, in 2011, at the World Championships, he finished second in the large hill Gundersen at Holmenkollen. The latest win, in Ruka, Finland, in 2014.

Johannes Rydzek, jumping for the first time shortly before his fifth birthday, discovered his passion for Nordic sports at a young age. "I always went cross-country skiing with my parents. My dad was also a volunteer at the Four Hills Tournament, and that was also a reason why I always wanted to jump", the "Junior-Athlete of the Year 2011" remembers. As a child, he first started ski jumping and cross-country skiing separately from each other. Johannes, who made his World Cup debut in Kuusamo in 2008, is fascinated by the combination of speed and endurance that Nordic Combined has to offer.

At a young age, he can look back on some successes in his career, winning three silver medals at World Championships and a bronze and silver medal at Olympic Games. The resident of Oberstdorf, Germany, has another great achievement in his list of merits concerning the Summer Grand Prix. In the past four years, he has always been able to win at least one competition in front of his home crowd, crowning his success with the win of the overall SGP ranking in 2011. With four total World Cup victories, three in the past winter season of 2013/14, the young German has upped the ante and was hot on the heels of teammate Eric Frenzel, taking second place in the overall World Cup ranking.

2015 became the most successful in his career: Johannes Rydzek won 4 medals at World Championships in Falun. The result of 2 gold, 1 silver, and 1 bronze medal made him the most successful athlete at the Championships 2015.

The last break-through of Johannes Rydzek in 2015 became his nomination for the main sports award in Germany: "Sportspersonality of the Year" (German: Sportler des Jahres) 2015, where he was announced as a winner together with the nordic combined team (nomination: Team of Year) and ranked as 3rd in personal voting by German broadcaster ZDF.

In October 2016 Johannes Rydzek wins his 6th title of German Champion in the town of Oberhof.

At the 2018 Winter Olympics, Rydzek won a gold medal in the Individual Gundersen LH/10 km Cross-Country, finishing before his teammates Fabian Rießle and Eric Frenzel. This also marked the first time since 1976 that three German athletes managed to secure medals in the same Nordic combined event at Olympic Games. Rydzek managed to secure another gold medal in the Men's Team competition alongside Rießle, Frenzel and Vinzenz Geiger on 22 February.

He was awarded the Holmenkollen Medal in 2021.

Personal life
Rydzek is the brother of cross-country skier Coletta Rydzek.

Record

Olympic Games

World Championship

World Cup

Individual victories

References

External links

1991 births
German male Nordic combined skiers
Living people
Nordic combined skiers at the 2010 Winter Olympics
Nordic combined skiers at the 2014 Winter Olympics
Nordic combined skiers at the 2018 Winter Olympics
Nordic combined skiers at the 2022 Winter Olympics
Olympic Nordic combined skiers of Germany
Olympic gold medalists for Germany
Olympic silver medalists for Germany
Olympic bronze medalists for Germany
Olympic medalists in Nordic combined
FIS Nordic World Ski Championships medalists in Nordic combined
Medalists at the 2010 Winter Olympics
Medalists at the 2014 Winter Olympics
Medalists at the 2018 Winter Olympics
People from Oberstdorf
Sportspeople from Swabia (Bavaria)